Passengers is an album by vibraphonist Gary Burton's Quartet with acoustic bassist Eberhard Weber recorded in 1976 and released on the ECM label in 1977. Burton and Weber are featured along with guitarist Pat Metheny, bass guitarist Steve Swallow and drummer Danny Gottlieb. The album is notable for including several early Metheny compositions.

Reception 
The Allmusic review by Scott Yanow awarded the album 4 stars, stating, "Although none of the individual songs caught on, the attractive sound of the post-bop unit and an opportunity to hear Pat Metheny in his formative period make this a CD reissue worth exploring".

Track listing

Personnel 
 Gary Burton – vibraphone
Pat Metheny – guitar
Steve Swallow – bass guitar
Eberhard Weber – double bass
Dan Gottlieb – drums

References 

ECM Records albums
Gary Burton albums
Eberhard Weber albums
1977 albums
Albums produced by Manfred Eicher